This article is a list about the  mayors  of Longueuil, Quebec and the municipalities that were folded into Longueuil to make the current city.

History
Before 1961, seven separate communities existed to form what is today known as Longueuil. They merged over the following decades, and Longueuil reached its current state. 

This section lists a series of mergers involving Longueuil. In italic is the surviving municipality.

1961-1969
On January 28, 1961 these communities merged, keeping Longueuil's namesake:
 Longueuil
 Montréal-Sud

1969-2001
In 1969, Longueuil merged again with another neighbouring city:
 Longueuil
 Ville Jacques-Cartier

In October, 1971, neighbouring Saint-Hubert had a merger as well:
 Saint-Hubert
 Laflèche

2002-2005
On January 1, 2002, Longueuil and seven other south shore municipalities merged:
 Longueuil
 Boucherville
 Brossard
 Greenfield Park
 LeMoyne
 Saint-Bruno-de-Montarville
 Saint-Hubert
 Saint-Lambert

2006-present
On January 1, 2006, four of the municipalities previously merged in 2002 voted to secede from Longueuil:
 Boucherville
 Brossard
 Saint-Bruno-de-Montarville
 Saint-Lambert
Therefore, Longueuil is currently composed of:
 Longueuil
 Greenfield Park
 LeMoyne
 Saint-Hubert

List of mayors

Longueuil

Merged municipalities

Montréal-Sud

Ville Jacques-Cartier

Laflèche

Saint-Hubert

LeMoyne

Greenfield Park

External links
 City of Longueuil - Borough of Le Vieux-Longueuil
 City of Longueuil - Borough of Greenfield Park
 City of Longueuil - Borough of Saint-Hubert
 Societé historique du Marigot

 
Longueuil
1961 establishments in Quebec